Blacksmith Scene (also known as Blacksmith Scene #1 and Blacksmithing Scene) is an 1893 American short black-and-white silent film directed by William K.L. Dickson, the Scottish-French inventor who, while under the employ of Thomas Edison, developed one of the first fully functional motion picture cameras.
It is historically significant as the first Kinetoscope film shown in public exhibition on May 9, 1893, and is the earliest known example of actors performing a role in a film. 102 years later, in 1995, Blacksmithing Scene was selected for preservation in the United States National Film Registry by the Library of Congress as being "culturally, historically, or aesthetically significant". It is the second-oldest film included in the Registry, after Newark Athlete (1891).

Production
The film was produced by the Edison Manufacturing Company, which had begun making films in 1890 under the direction of William K.L. Dickson. It was filmed entirely within the Black Maria studio at West Orange, New Jersey, in the United States, which is widely referred to as "America's First Movie Studio". It is believed to have been filmed in April 1893 and was shown publicly, in a Kinetoscope viewer, at the Brooklyn Institute on May 9, 1893.

According to the Internet Movie Database the film was made in a 35 mm format with an aspect ratio of 1.33:1. The movie was intended to be displayed through means of a Kinetoscope. Dickson selected a lens that worked best for Medium shots and medium close-up shots and probably stationed his camera approximately ten to twelve feet from the anvil.

The men featured are not true blacksmiths, nor are they in a blacksmith shop working on metal: they are performers on a set pretending to be blacksmiths and to have a drink in between. While the background is simply left black, the crew went through some trouble to bring in a real anvil, real sledgehammers and leather aprons.

Cast

Awards and nominations

Current status 
A surviving 35-mm print of this film was found at the Henry Ford Museum; it is the source of the negative preserved by the Museum of Modern Art film archive. Another copy is at the Edison National Historic Site, administered by the National Park Service. Because the film was finished before 1925, its copyright has expired; it is freely available on the World Wide Web.

See also
Treasures from American Film Archives

References

External links
 
 
 
 
 Blacksmith Scene essay by Daniel Eagan in America's Film Legacy: The Authoritative Guide to the Landmark Movies in the National Film Registry, A&C Black, 2010 , pages 1–2 

1893 films
1890s American films
American black-and-white films
American silent short films
Thomas Edison
United States National Film Registry films
Films directed by William Kennedy Dickson
Articles containing video clips
Films shot in New Jersey
1893 short films